This is an incomplete list of U.S. Department of Defense code names primarily the two-word series variety. Officially, Arkin (2005) says that there are three types of code name:
 Nicknames – a combination of two separate unassociated and unclassified words (e.g. Polo and Step) assigned to represent a specific program, special access program, exercise, or activity.
 Code words – a single classified word (e.g. BYEMAN) which identifies a specific special access program or portion. A list of several such code words can be seen at Byeman Control System.
 Exercise terms – a combination of two words, normally unclassified, used exclusively to designate an exercise or test

In 1975, the Joint Chiefs of Staff introduced the Code Word, Nickname, and Exercise Term System (NICKA) which automated the assignment of names. NICKA gives each DOD organization a series of two-letter alphabetic sequences, requiring each 'first word' or a nickname to begin with a letter pair. For example, AG through AL was assigned to United States Joint Forces Command.

The general system described above is now in use by NATO, the United Kingdom, Canada (Atlantic Guard, Atlantic Spear, Atlantic Shield) Australia and New Zealand, and allies/partners including countries like Sweden.

List of code names

A 
 Able – NATO Allied Command Europe and U.S. European Command nuclear weapons exercise first word. First gained prominence after the Able Archer 83 nuclear command and control exercise.
 Able Ally – annual command post exercise involving escalation to nuclear use. Held November/December/
 Able Archer 83
 Able Crystal – nuclear weapons related exercise
 Able Gain – annual United States Air Forces in Europe field training exercise involving NATO Nuclear sharing forces
 Able Staff – command post exercise, April–September 1997, practicing SACEUR's nuclear warning system.
 Able – Coast Guard first word
 Able Manner – Windward Passage patrols to interdict Haitian migrants, January 1993-November 1993.
 Able Response, Able Vigil
 Able Avionics – Air Training Command program of 1976 to provide only elemental training for avionics systems maintenance at training centers, with further training given at field training detachments.
 Able Chief – Air Training Command program of 1976 to provide only elemental training for crew chiefs at training centers, with further training given at field training detachments.
 Operation Able Sentry/Sabre 1993–1999 – U.S. Army task force attached to United Nations Preventive Deployment Force (UNPREDEP) in Macedonia to monitor border activity.
 Ace Guard was a NATO deployment of the ACE Mobile Force (Air) and surface to air missiles to Turkey, between 3 January 1991 – 8 March 1991. Turkey had requested greater NATO forces to be deployed to meet any Iraqi threat after the Iraqi invasion of Kuwait on 2 August 1990.
 Operation Acid Gambit – Operation undertaken by U.S. Army Delta Force and the 160th SOAR to rescue Kurt Muse, a U.S. citizen involved in the broadcast of anti-Noriega material, during the United States invasion of Panama, 1989.
 Active Edge was a routine no-notice NATO Allied Forces Central Europe readiness exercise held twice yearly. "The most recent such exercise took place, on the date and in the format planned, on 12th June 1989. It did not include the exercise deployment of forces outside their garrisons." (House of Lords Debate 27 June 1989)
 Operation Active Endeavour – NATO Allied Forces Southern Europe Mediterranean patrols
 Adventure – ACE Mobile Force first word
 Adventure Exchange – command post exercise
 Adventure Express – winter exercise series, dating to at least 1983.
 African – U.S.-Moroccan EUCOM (now Africa Command) first word
 African Eagle – U.S.-Moroccan biennial exercise practicing deployment of USAF units to Morocco. Dates to at least 1984.
 African Falcon '85, African Fox '85.
 African Lion – in 2009 described as "Train forces capable of conducting joint and combined U.S., air, and land combat interoperability operations."
 Exercise Agile Spirit 19 began with dual opening ceremonies at Senaki Air Base and Vaziani Training Area in the country of Georgia on July 27, 2019. Approximately 3,300 military personnel from 14 allied and partner nations will participate in the exercise.
 Exercise Alam Halfa – U.S.-New Zealand, NZ-sponsored land forces exercise, Linton and Napier, central North Island, April 26-May 6, 2012. The new exercise series, according to the New Zealand Herald, was made possible by the "Wellington Declaration" signed by the two countries in November 2010. Continued probably yearly after that point; Alam Halfa 2013. Named for the Battle of Alam Halfa during World War II.
 Allied – NATO Allied Command Europe first word
 Allied Action, Allied Effort – CJTF exercises
 Operation Allied Force 1999 – Air war over Serbia to withdraw forces from Kosovo.
 Operations Allied Goodwill I & II, 4–9 February & 27 February-24 March 1992. After the collapse of the Soviet Union in December 1991, NATO flew teams of humanitarian assistance experts and medical advisors to Russia and other former Soviet states using NATO Airborne Early Warning Force trainer cargo aircraft.
 Operation Amber Star – Delta Force and Intelligence Support Activity anti-Persons Indicted for War Crimes (PIFWC) reconnaissance and surveillance, Bosnia-Herzegovina
 Operation Anchor Guard – 10 August 1990 – 9 March 1991. Following the Iraqi invasion of Kuwait of 2 August 1990, NATO Airborne Early Warning Force Boeing E-3 Sentry aircraft were moved to Konya, Turkey to monitor the situation. The aircraft remained based at Konya to maintain surveillance of south-eastern Turkey throughout the crisis, which led to the Gulf War of January–March 1991.
 Anatolian Eagle – an air force exercise hosted by the Turkish Air Force and held in Konya, Turkey. There are both national and international exercises held, the international exercises usually involving air arms of the United States, other NATO forces, and Asian countries. The first exercise, Anatolian Eagle 01, was held by TAF Operations Command on 18–29 June 2001. As well as Turkey, the air forces of USA and Israel also participated.
 Operation Arc Light  B-52 operations in Southeast Asia.
 Operation Arid Farmer – 1983 Support to the crisis in Chad
 Ardent Sentry – annual U.S. Northern Command homeland security/defense exercise.
 Armada Sweep – U.S. Navy electronic surveillance from ships off the coast of East Africa to support drone operations in the region.
 Exercises Atlantic Guard (May 2002, Land Forces Atlantic Area); Atlantic Spear (18-22 November 2002, hosted by LFAA); Atlantic Shield (12 May 2003, hosted by Halifax Port Authority - Canadian interagency homeland security exercises.
 Atlas – U.S. European Command/Africa Command African and sometimes European operation first word
 Atlas Drop – from 1997 to 2003, U.S.-Tunisian exercise
 Central Accord 14 was started by U.S. European Command in 1996, at which time it was called Atlas Drop. AFRICOM took over the exercise in 2008, and renamed it Atlas Accord in 2012. This put it in line with AFRICOM's other “Accord series” exercises, which focus on training African ground forces. Atlas Accord 12 was an AFRICOM Mali-based medical exercise conducted in Mopti, Mali, on 7–15 February 2012 despite the cancellation of Flintlock 12. The joint-aerial-delivery exercise, hosted by U.S. Army Africa, brought together Army personnel with African armed forces to enhance air drop capabilities and ensure effective delivery of military resupply materials and humanitarian aid.
 Atlas Eagle – in 2009 described as "Train forces capable of conducting joint and combined U.S., air, and land combat interoperability operations."
 Atlas Response – response to Mozambique floods of 2001
 Atlas Vision – peacekeeping exercise with Russia. Atlas Vision 2012 appears to have been the first of a series, according to commentators at Small Wars Journal. Atlas Vision 2013 took place in Germany. U.S. European Command had been in the planning stages for Atlas Vision 2014, which was to take place in July in Chelyabinsk (Chelyabinsk Oblast), and focus on joint peace-keeping operations. Because of the 2014 pro-Russian conflict in Ukraine, “all planning for this exercise has been suspended.”
 Attain Document – in 1986, the US Navy began several "Freedom of Navigation" operations in the area around Libya, the first two parts of the operation being held from January 26–30, and February 12–15 without incident. The third part began on 23 March 1986 and led to the Action in the Gulf of Sidra (1986).
 Operation Assured Delivery – DOD logistical support to humanitarian aid efforts in Georgia following the Russo-Georgian War in 2008.
 Assured Lift – a Joint Task Force carried out move of Economic Community of West African States Monitoring Group cease-fire monitoring troops into Liberia, March–April 1997, from Abidjan. See also European Command documentation.
 Assured Response – a Joint Task Force carried out Non-combatant evacuation operation from Monrovia, Liberia, 8 April-12 August 1996. Run by Special Operations Command, Europe.
 Operation Auburn Endeavor 1998 – relocation of uranium fuel from Tbilisi, Georgia.
 Exercise Austere Challenge – October 2012 US-Israel military exercise (missile defense). Austere Challenge '15 was a warfighting exercise conducted across several locations in the U.S. European Command area, which involved participation by the 1 (German/Netherlands) Corps.
 Austere Strike – U.S. Air Force system utilizing an electro-optical seeker and tracker for acquisition and tracking missions flown by McDonnell Douglas F-4 Phantom II aircraft.
 Autumn Forge – A series of NATO exercises conducted each year in Allied Command Europe. It began in 1975 linking a number of training exercises under a common scenario, to present a more potent public image. Autumn Forge 83.
 Operation Autumn Return – non-combatant evacuation operation (NEO) in Côte d'Ivoire, September–October 2002.
 Operation Avid Recovery – U.S. European Command activities with Nigerian and British service personnel in clearing unexploded ordnance left over after the 2002 Lagos armoury explosion at Ikeja Cantonment, Lagos, on 27 January 2002. U.S. Explosive Ordnance Disposal soldiers helped to "stabilize" the cantonment area, as well as "providing safety training to the public and special ordnance handling training" for Nigerian Armed Forces personnel.
 Joint Task Force Aztec Silence – European Command "established Joint Task Force AZTEC SILENCE under the Commander of the U.S. Sixth Fleet in December 2003 to counter transnational terrorism in the under-governed areas of Northern Africa and to build closer alliances with those governments. In support of this, U.S. Navy intelligence, surveillance and reconnaissance assets Lockheed P-3 Orions based in Sigonella, Sicily were used to collect and share information with partner nations and their militaries. This robust cooperative ISR effort was augmented by the release of intelligence collected by national assets."

B 
 Baker Blade – Classified exercise.
 Baker Mint – Conducted by the US Army and Malaysia in 1997. 
 Baker Mint 99-1 – Conducted by the US Army and Malaysia in 1999. Trained on military intelligence and photo-surveillance.
 Baker Mint Lens 99 – Conducted by the US Army and Malaysia in 1999.
 Baker Mondial V – Conducted by the US Army and Mongolia in 1997. Trained on medical procedures.
 Baker Mongoose II – Conducted by the US Army and Mongolia in 1995.
 Baker Piston Lens 2000 – Conducted by the US Army and the Philippines in 2000.
 Baker Tepid – A series of eight exercises conducted by the US Army and Thailand.
 Baker Torch – A series of three exercises conducted by the US Army and Thailand from 1999 to 2001. Trained on border control.
 Baker Torch Lens – Conducted by the US Army and Thailand. Trained on diving.
 Banner – First word for withdrawal of USAF units from Thailand in extension of Keystone operations
 Banner Star – Inactivation of 43d Tactical Electronic Warfare Squadron, 556th Civil Engineering Squadron (Heavy Repair), 609th Special Operations Squadron, discontinuance of F-102 detachment at Udorn and movement of planes to Clark Air Base, consolidating F-105s at Takhli, reduction of C-121s of 553d Reconnaissance Wing by one third.
 Banner Sun – Ended USAF activities at Takhli Royal Thai Air Force Base; inactivated 355th Tactical Fighter Wing, moved F-105s to Kadena Air Base, moved one squadron of Wild Weasel aircraft to Korat, reduced 553d Reconnaissance Wing to a squadron, moved 11th Tactical Reconnaissance Squadron to United States, discontinued F-102 detachment at Don Muang and movement of planes to Clark Air Base.
 Bar None – Strategic Air Command exercise to test operational effectiveness of a wing.  Name replaced by Buy None.
 Exercise Battle Griffin – amphibious exercise practising reception, staging, and operation of a Marine Air-Ground Task Force in defense of Northern Norway. Also involved UK, Netherlands. In 1991 Exercise Battle Griffin took place in February–March. That year the 2nd MEB made the first test of the Norway Air-Landed Marine Expeditionary Brigade, composed completely of Marine Corps Reserve units as Operation Desert Storm was getting under way. The force comprised HQ Company 25th Marines, 3/25 Marines, Co E, 4th Reconnaissance Battalion, and 1st Battalion, 14th Marines (artillery, composed of HQ, Alpha, and Bravo Batteries). Battle Griffin 93; Battle Griffin 96.
 Beacon Flash – U.S.-Oman dissimilar air combat exercise going back to the 1970s. Carrier Air Wing 1 flying from  carried out at least two 'Beacon Flash' exercises in the first half of 1983 (Command History 1983).
 Operation Big Buzz – a U.S. military entomological warfare field test conducted in the U.S. state of Georgia in 1955.
 Operation Big Star – Minuteman Mobility Test Train rail-mobile test of deployment of Minuteman ICBMs, 1960.
 Big Safari – a United States Air Force program begun in 1952 which provides management, direction, and control of the acquisition, modification, and logistics support for special purpose weapons systems derived from existing aircraft and systems.
 Operation Blade Jewel – the return of military dependents to the U.S. at the time of the United States invasion of Panama.
 Operation Blue Bat – Deployment of Composite Air Strike Force to Lebanon in 1958
 Blue Springs – Joint Chiefs of Staff directive for photographic reconnaissance in Southeast Asia using SAC Ryan Model 147 drones. First mission flown from Kadena Air Base 20 August 1964.  Moved to Bien Hoa Air Base in October 1964.  Included missions over China. Renamed Bumble Bug on 1 August 1967.
 Bold Alligator – post Cold War Pacific Fleet amphibious exercise, with foreign participation.
 Bold Quest – Nearly 1,800 military personnel from U.S. and partner nations participated in Bold Quest 17.2 in Savannah, Georgia, the latest in a series of coalition capability demonstration and assessment events sponsored by the Joint Staff. Over the course of 18 days in October–November, members of the U.S. armed services, National Guard, U.S. Special Operations Command, NATO Headquarters and 16 partner states participated in the demonstration, which collected technical data on systems and subjective judgments from the warfighters using them.
 Bounty Hunter – counter-space electronic warfare system located at Peterson Air Force Base, tested by 17th Test Squadron on behalf of United States Space Force during February 2020. 
 Exercise Bright Star – U.S./Egypt, downsizing
 Buckskin Rider – one of numerous exercises 40th Air Division, USAF, took part in 1951–89 time period.
 Operation Buffalo Hunter – Drone reconnaissance operations over North Vietnam
 Operation Bullet Shot – temporary duty assignment of US-based technicians to Andersen Air Force Base, Guam, during the Vietnam War. Known as "the herd shot 'round the world".)
 Bumble Bug – Photographic reconnaissance in Southeast Asia using SAC Ryan Model 147 drones. Replaced Blue Springs on 1 August 1967. Renamed Bumpy Action in December 1968
 Bumpy Action – Ryan AQM-34 (formerly Model 147) drone reconnaissance missions over Southeast Asia from December 1968.  Formerly Bumble Bug. Mostly low level missions, when high resolution photography was required, or cloud cover prevented SR-71 photography. After October 1969, included missions as far as 200 miles into China.  Operations moved to U-Tapao Royal Thai Naval Airfield in July 1970.
 Operation Burnt Frost – interception and destruction of a non-functioning U.S. National Reconnaissance Office (NRO) satellite named USA-193. A launch from the cruiser Lake Erie took place on February 20, 2008.
 Busy Plotter – Program to increase proficiency of Strategic Air Command navigators by training them using Air Training Command Boeing T-43 aircraft, rather than the more expensive B-52s, due to high fuel costs from 1979 to October 1981.
 Busy Sentry – Strategic Air Command exercise for intercontinental ballistic missile units.
 Busy Sentry II – Strategic Air Command Single Integrated Operational Plan (SIOP) 4D missile training assistance program
 Busy Player – Exercise which included participation of 40th Air Division (in 1951–89 period).
 Busy Usher – Strategic Air Command launch of No. 13 LF-02 missile MK-1 Minuteman-II
 Button Up – Strategic Air Command security system reset procedures used during Minuteman facility wind down
 Buy None – Strategic Air Command exercise to test operational effectiveness of wings.  Name replaced Bar None. Included participation of 40th Air Division in 1951–89 period.

C 
 Operation Calm Support 1998–1999 – Support to Kosovo Diplomatic Observer Mission mission.
 Exercise Carte Blanche - NATO atomic warfare exercise, circa 1955, which the 21st Fighter-Bomber Group took part in, vicinity of Central Europe. 
 Celestial Balance – 2009 Baraawe raid in Somalia that killed Saleh Ali Saleh Nabhan
 Exercise Central Enterprise – NATO Allied Forces Baltic Approaches/Allied Forces Central Europe exercise, "designed to test the integrated air defense system throughout Western Europe. Regular exercises which incorporate a major military low flying element over the United Kingdom include Exercises Elder Forest (once every two years), Elder Joust (once a year), Central Enterprise (once a year), Mallet Blow (twice a year), OSEX (once a year) and Salty Hammer (once a year). Some of these exercises test and practice the United Kingdom air defenses while others primarily provide aircrews with training in tactical low flying techniques. The June 1982 Central Enterprise exercise marked the first practical test of the new NATO airborne early warning system." 1997 included deployment of 301st Fighter Wing, Air Force Reserve.
 Circuit Gold – On 7 November 1973 CINC Pacific Fleet announced the deployment of a Circuit Gold aircraft to monitor units of the Soviet Navy. Circuit Gold was the name for Navy special multi-sensor Lockheed P-3A aircraft. Two such aircraft were assigned to the United States Pacific Fleet, operated by VP-4. (CINCPAC Command History 1973, 254, 281/818 at Nautilus)
 Operation Chrome Dome – Strategic Air Command airborne alert indoctrination training.
 Cobra Ball – Boeing RC-135 reconnaissance aircraft
 Cobra Dane – AN/FPS-108 Cobra Dane passive electronically scanned array (PESA) phased array radar installation operated by Raytheon for the United States Air Force at Eareckson Air Station, Alaska. It was built in 1976 and brought on-line in 1977 to verify Soviet compliance with the SALT II arms limitation treaty.
 Cobra Eye – Boeing RC-135X reconnaissance aircraft with mission of tracking ICBM reentry vehicles. In 1993, it was converted into an additional RC-135S Cobra Ball. The sole aircraft was converted during the mid-to-late-1980s from a C-135B Telemetry/Range Instrumented Aircraft, serial number 62–4128.

 Cobra Jaw – Cobra King: radar/intelligence programs
 Cobra Judy – AN/SPQ-11 passive electronically scanned array (PESA) radar mounted aboard the missile range instrumentation ship  up until 2014.
 Cobra Mist – Anglo-American experimental over-the-horizon radar station at Orford Ness, Suffolk, England. It was known technically as AN/FPS-95 and sometimes referred to as System 441a; a reference to the project as a whole.
 Cobra Shoe – reported Over The Horizon (Backscatter) (OTH-B) radar designed by RCA Corporation, designed to monitor ballistic missile tests in the interior of the Soviet Union, installed in the Western Sovereign Base Area (Akrotiri), Cyprus. Source is "U.S. declassified documents". Installed since around 1964; no details on when/whether it left service.
 Copper Dune - Joint Special Operations Command strike operations in Yemen/Arabian Peninsula, 2011-2012.
 Combat Angel – 1970s tactical electronic warfare drone system.
 Combat Pacer - in 1966, Elmendorf Air Force Base began providing more support for Military Airlift Command with Lockheed C-5 Galaxy and C-141 Starlifter flights to and from Japan, Okinawa and further south, supporting the Vietnam War. The aerial port at the base (602d Military Airlift Support Squadron) was expanded in January 1966 for these flights. Initially referred to as Fly Fast, the operation name was changed in 1967 to Combat Pacer.
 Combat Sent – Boeing RC-135U "Combat Sent" electronic listening aircraft are designed to collect intelligence from adversary radar emissions. The data helps develop new or upgraded radar warning receivers, radar jammers, decoys, anti-radiation missiles, and training simulators.
 Combat Tree – AN/APX-80 equipment installed on McDonnell F-4D Phantom II aircraft to enable them to locate and identify Vietnam People's Air Force aircraft by interrogating their Identification Friend or Foe (IFF) equipment.
 Comfy Levy – Volant Solo EC-130Es using palletized electronics and clip on antennas to conduct Senior Scout and Senior Hunter missions with operators from Electronic Security Command.
 Commando Bearcat, Commando Jade, and Commando Night – regional exercises supported by 314th Air Division, Fifth Air Force, in South Korea, 1955–84.
 Commando Buzz – 1970 Employment of Coronet Solo EC-121s to aid the Cambodian Government by rebroadcasting civil radio broadcasts to remote areas of the country.
 Commando Club - US operation of the Vietnam War which used command guidance of aircraft by radar at Lima Site 85 in Laos  for ground-directed bombing (GDB) of targets in North Vietnam and clandestine targets in Laos.
 Exercise Commando Sling – Approximately three deployments of USAF F-15s and F-16s from both Active Duty and National Guard units from around the world are made each year to Singapore under this title. The 497th Combat Training Flight takes part in regional exercise and global contingencies, and provides housing; morale, recreation and welfare facilities and programs: medical services; force protection to resources and personnel; and legal, financial, communications, and contracting support to assigned and deployed personnel.
 Commando Solo – Volant Solo psychological warfare program renamed with upgrades to EC-130Es (and later EC-130Js).  Originally Coronet Solo with EC-121Ss.
 Compass Arrow – Originally Lone Eagle. Design of longer range reconnaissance drone starting in 1966. Ryan AQM-91 Firefly
 Compass Call – EC-130H electronic warfare aircraft.  Programmed for upgrade to EC-37Bs,
 Compass Cookie – Ryan AQM-34N high altitude drones modified to optimize intercept of Soviet SA-2 surface to air missile downlink signals.  Deployed to U-Tapao Royal Thai Navy Airfield, with missions flown in September 1972.
 Constant – Arkin lists this prefix as an 'Air force operations first word, often referring to Air Force Technical Applications Center and other reconnaissance missions. Constant programs in the 1980s included Constant Bore, Constant Dome, Constant Fish, Constant Globe, Constant Seek, and Constant Take.'
 Arkin lists Constant subprograms included Constant Blue (Presidential successor helicopter evacuation plan), Constant Gate, Constant Help, Constant Phoenix (55th Wing nuclear monitoring) Constant Pisces, Constant Shotgun, Constant Source, Constant Spur, Constant Star, Constant Stare (an Air Intelligence Agency organization).
 Project Constant Growth – From October 1975 to July 1976 name of program to give copilots of heavy airlift and bombardment aircraft experience by flying smaller training aircraft.  Nickname dropped and program retitled Accelerated Copilot Enrichment.
 Constant Peg – evaluation of clandestinely-acquired Soviet fighter aircraft at Nellis Air Force Base, Nevada, by 4477th Test and Evaluation Squadron. The idea of a more realistic training program for the Air Force was devised by USAF Colonel Gail Peck, a Vietnam veteran F-4 pilot, who was dissatisfied with his service's fighter pilot training. After the war, he worked at the Department of Defense, where he heard about the Have Drill and Have Doughnut programs. He won the support of USAF General Hoyt S. Vandenberg, Jr. and launched "Constant Peg," named after Vandenberg's callsign, "Constant," and Peck's wife, Peg.
 Operation Continuing Promise - periodic series of US military exercises conducted under the direction of United States Southern Command. Designated by Roman numeral (“Continuing Promise I” was in 2007), or by year (“Continuing Promise 2009”); they provide medical, dental and veterinary aid to people in Latin America.
 Operation Cool Shoot – live missile firing exercise, held at Tyndall AFB, Florida, with participation of 21st Composite Wing, Alaskan Air Command.
 Exercise Cope North is an annual multinational military exercise taking place in and around Guam. The first exercise took place in 1978.
 Exercise Cope Thunder – A Pacific Air Forces-sponsored exercise initiated in 1976, Cope Thunder was devised as a way to give aircrews their first taste of warfare and quickly grew into PACAF's "premier simulated combat airpower employment exercise." Moved from Clark Air Base to Eielson Air Force Base in Alaska in 1992, permanently, after the eruption of Mount Pinatubo.
 Exercise Cope Tiger – USAF exercise in Thailand
 Corona South - the 72nd Bombardment Wing at Ramey Air Force Base in Puerto Rico hosted the annual United States Air Force Commander's Conferences, code named Corona South, which began on an irregular basis in 1955. By the 1960s, Corona South had become a regular annual event at Ramey. It continued until the wing was inactivated.  Military Airlift Command then continued them until Ramey closed and they were transferred to Homestead Air Force Base, Florida.
 Coronet Bare – 1969 demonstration of "bare base" concept of deployment.
 Coronet Cobra – Deployment of Coronet Solo EC-121s to Korat Royal Thai Air Base.
 Coronet Nighthawk – Operation Coronet Nighthawk was a Caribbean deployment of Air Force fighters.
 Coronet Oak – the continuing operation in which Air Force Reserve Command (AFRC) and Air National Guard (ANG) C-130 aircraft, aircrews and related support personnel deploy from the United States to Muñiz Air National Guard Base, Puerto Rico, to provide theater airlift support for the U.S. Southern Command. The mission moved from Howard Air Force Base, Panama, as a result of the U.S. military withdrawal from Panama, from April 1999. Units rotate in and out of Muñiz ANGB every two weeks. Forces assigned to Coronet Oak provide United States Southern Command with logistic and contingency support throughout Central and South America. The mission typically covers embassy resupply, medical evacuations, and support of U.S. troops and/or the Drug Enforcement Administration.
 Coronet Solo – EC-121Ss modified for psychological warfare to broadcast radio and TV with electronic warfare capability.  Renamed Volant Solo with introduction of EC-130Es.
 Creek – USAFE first word
 Creek Action – Command-wide effort by Hq USAFE to realign functions and streamline operations, 1973
 Creek Caste – intelligence program/project
 Creek Claw – intelligence program/project
 Creek Klaxon - In 1986, the 119th Fighter-Interceptor Group (ND ARNG) assumed the USAF Zulu alert mission at Ramstein Air Base, West Germany. The 119th and other Reserve Component Air Defense units rotated to Ramstein and stood continuous air sovereignty alert for one year, provided for NATO.
 Creek Party – Deployment of Air National Guard Boeing KC-97 tankers to Europe to support United States Air Forces Europe operations.
 Operation Crescent Wind - initial air attack against Taliban/Al Qaeda in Afghanistan after the September 11 terrorist attacks, from 7 October 2001.

D 
 Operation Dawn Blitz – Post 2010 amphibious exercise with foreign participation
 Exercise Dawn Patrol was a five-nation NATO naval and air exercise conducted throughout the Mediterranean in 1974. The U.S. contribution to the exercise was based on the USS America carrier battle group.
 Operation Deep Freeze Annual resupply operations for American scientific sites in Antarctica.
 Exercise Deep Furrow – 1960s-1970s Allied Forces Southern Europe exercise practicing the defense of Greece and Turkey.
 Deep Siren – Raytheon/RRK/Ultra Electronics Maritime Systems expendable "long-range acoustic tactical pager", launched via sub/surface/air-launched buoy (JDW 21 Nov 2007).
 Operation Deliberate Force 1995 – NATO air strikes on Bosnian Serb military forces.
 Operation Deny Flight 1993–1995 – U.S./NATO enforcement of no-fly zone over Bosnia-Herzegovina.
 Operation Desert – various
 Desert Crossing 1999 – tested response to possible fall of Iraqi President Saddam Hussein.
 Operation Desert Fox 1998 – air strikes on Iraq WMD sites.
 Operation Desert Lion began on 27 March 2003, during the War in Afghanistan (2001–2021). U.S. Army soldiers from the 505th Parachute Infantry Regiment launched an operation in the Kohe Safi Mountains and surrounding areas in the Kandahar Province of Afghanistan. Their mission was to hunt for supplies and members of the Taliban and Al-Qaida.
 Operation Desert Shield
 Operation Desert Storm – War to remove Iraq from Kuwait, 1991.
 Operation Desert Strike – 1996 missile strikes on Iraq.
 Operation Desert Thunder
 Destined Glory – Cold War NATO naval exercise, Mediterranean
 Operation Determined Falcon 1998 – 80-aircraft NATO show of force over Albania near Kosovo.
 Operation Determined Forge - maritime component of Operation Joint Force (SFOR II).
Operation Determined Guard - the first naval activity associated with Operation Joint Guard (the Stabilization Force (invariably known as "S-For") in Bosnia-Herzegovina).
Determined Promise-03 (DP-03) was a two-week, multi-level exercise which started on August 18, 2002, with a simulated outbreak of pneumonic plague in Nevada, adding a hurricane, an air threat in Alaska, and a train wreck in Kentucky to the list of 1,700 'injects' that would crop up during the exercise. DP-03 was intended as the final testing event before the declaration of Full Operational Capability for U.S. Northern Command, with DHS and a total of 34 federal agencies represented.
 Operation Dragoon Ride
 Operation Dragon Rouge – Airlift of Belgian troops to evacuate civilians during rebellion in the Congo, 1964.
 Dust Hardness – A modification improvement to Minuteman-III approved for service use in 1972
 Operation Eager Glacier was a secret United States effort to spy on Iran with aircraft in 1987 and 1988. The information gathered became part of an intelligence exchange between U.S. military intelligence services and Iraq during the Iran–Iraq War.

E 
 Exercise Eager Light – In October 2012, more than 70 U.S. 1st Armored Division personnel deployed to Jordan to conduct Exercise Eager Light, a 30-day command post exercise that focuses on brigade-level warfighting tactics and procedures. This exercise dates back to the mid-1980s.
 Exercise Eager Lion – Eager Lion 12 took place in Jordan. Now the largest U.S. military exercise in the Middle East, surpassing Bright Star. The exercise "amounts to an outgrowth of the annual bilateral "Infinite Moonlight" US-Jordan exercise that stretches back to the 1990s." Now possibly involves Syrian Civil War contingencies.
 Operation Eagle Claw – Unsuccessful attempt to rescue hostages held by Iran in the American Embassy in Tehran.
 Operation Eagle Eye 1998–1999 – Monitoring compliance with United Nations Security Council Resolution 1199 in Kosovo.
 CONPLAN Eagle Guardian
 Operation Eagle Pull – Evacuation of Americans from Phnom Penh in April 1975.
 Operation Eagle's Summit (Oqab Tsuka in Pashto) was a military operation conducted by ISAF and Afghan National Army troops, with the objective of transporting a 220-tonne turbine to the Kajaki Dam in Helmand Province through territory controlled by Taliban insurgents. 2008.
 Operation Earnest Will – 1987–1988 protection of tankers in the Persian Gulf from Iranian attack.

 Operation Eastern Exit - evacuation of the United States Ambassador to Somalia and Embassy in Mogadishu, Somalia, in 1991.
 Exercise Eastern Wind - exercises with Somali National Army, 1980s. Held 1983 as amphibious component of Bright Star, including the deployment of VMFA(AW)-242 flying Grumman A-6 Intruders to Berbera. The exercise "failed dismally"; "The Somali army did not perform up to any standard," one diplomat said. ..The inefficiency of the Somali armed forces is legendary among foreign military men." The 24th Marine Expeditionary Unit participated in Eastern Wind in August 1987 in the area of Geesalay.
 Eastern Venture - reported Warning Order issued for airlift support to famine relief operations in Sudan, covered by CENTCOM Command History 1985, page 30 (via www3.centcom.mil/FOIALibrary).
 Operation El Dorado Canyon 1986 – USAF and USN air strikes on Libya in retaliation for terrorist bombing of La Belle Disco in West Berlin.
 Echo Casemate – Support of French and African peacekeeping forces in the Central African Republic.
 Operation Enduring Freedom – Anti-Al Qaeda operations in Afghanistan, including United States invasion of Afghanistan, War in Afghanistan (2001–2021), and other subsequent anti-terrorist operations.
 Operation Essential Harvest 2001 – Successful NATO program to disarm NLA in Macedonia.
 Fervent Archer – EUCOM directed Joint Special Operations Command task force in Sarajevo from 2001. Believed to be a continuation of 'Amber Star' (see above).
 Exercise Fearless Guardian 2015 – U.S./Ukrainian training exercise. (total 2,200 participants, including 1,000 U.S. military). Initial personnel and equipment of the 173rd Airborne Brigade arrived in Yavoriv, Lviv Oblast, on 10 April 2015. Fearless Guardian will train Ukraine's newly formed National Guard under the Congress-approved Global Contingency Security Fund. Under the program, the United States will begin training three battalions of Ukrainian troops over a six-month period beginning in April 2015.
 Exile Hunter – Training of Ethiopian forces for operations in Somalia

F 
 Falling Leaves (radar network) - improvised ballistic missile warning network created by the USAF during the Cuban Missile Crisis, 1962.
 Fincastle Trophy an anti-submarine warfare contest between the air forces of the United Kingdom, Australia, Canada and New Zealand. During the competition, crews compete in anti-submarine warfare, anti-surface warfare, and intelligence gathering, and surveillance.
 Flexible Anvil/Sky Anvil 1998 – Planning for Balkan/Kosovo operations. "JTF Flexible Anvil [ComSixthFleet, to plan and be prepared to execute a limited strike option using YTLAM and CALCM missiles]; and JTF Sky Anvil [COMAFFOR/Sixteenth Air Force, to plan a more extensive strike option using fixed wing aircraft] developed concrete military plans which were approved and ready for execution."
 Operation Fluid Drive - evacuation of non-combatants from Lebanon, 1980s.
 Operation Focus Relief – the movement and support of West African troops intended for dispatch to the United Nations Mission in Sierra Leone (UNAMSIL).
 Formidable Shield – seaborne ABM exercise using NATO Military Command Structure to direct ships. Formidable Shield 2019 utilized STRIKFORNATO in northern UK waters.
 Fox Able – Transatlantic deployment of jet fighter aircraft.
 Fox Able One – Deployment of a squadron of F-80 aircraft from Selfridge Air Force Base, Michigan to RAF Odiham, England in July 1948.
 Fox Peter—Transpacific deployment of jet fighter aircraft.
 Fox Peter One – Deployment of a wing of Republic F-84G Thunderjets from California to Japan, using air refueling in July 1952.
 Operation Fracture Cross Alpha – Operation to prevent North Vietnamese interference with air operations supporting Operation Lam Son 719.
 Operation Fracture Deep – Plan to strike Vietnam People's Air Force bases south of 20th parallel.  Combined with Operation Proud Bunch as Operation Proud Deep.
 Exercise Freedom Banner
 Operation Freedom Deal – Air interdiction and close air support strikes in Cambodia, 1970–1973.
 Operation Freedom Eagle – Part of Operation Enduring Freedom conducted in the Philippines
 Operation Freedom Falcon – 2011 military intervention in Libya
 Operation Freedom Sentinel – (or Freedom's Sentinel)  Post 2015 operations in Afghanistan
 Operation Freedom Train – Original name for Operation Linebacker I
 Operation Frequent Wind – Evacuation of civilians from Saigon in April 1975.

G 
 Gallant Hand – A large scale joint warfare training exercise held in 1972 at Fort Hood in which 23,000 soldiers and airmen participated.
 Gallant Journey 05 – Arkin write that this exercise was a "..Classified intelligence or special operations" activity held in March 2005, with DIA, NAS and CIA/OMA involvement.
 Gallant Knight – A command post exercise of the Rapid Deployment Force.
 Gallant Shield – Joint Chiefs of Staff directed and coordinated exercise.
 Gate Keeper - a special access program which provides clandestine support associated with State Department Foreign Emergency Support Team missions and classified special operations and intelligence missions. Authority appears to rest in part with United States Special Operations Command. The 45-seat Boeing C-32B Gatekeeper flies transport missions under this program.
 Giant Dragon – Replaced Trojan Horse as the name for SAC U-2 operations in Southeast Asia on 1 July 1967.  Became Giant Nail in July 1969.
 Giant Nail – Replaced Giant Dragon as name for U-2 operations in Southeast Asia in July 1969.
 Giant Plow – a United States Air Force Minuteman launcher closure test program
 Giant Profit – A Minuteman modified operational missile test plan
 Giant Patriot - operational base launch program of test flights of Minuteman-II missiles. The program was terminated by Congress in July 1974
 Giant Scale – SR-71 reconnaissance missions over Southeast Asia 1969
 Gigantic Charge – Program to notify NORAD of all or part of Single Integrated Operational Plan (SIOP) targeting for Minuteman
 Gin Player – Strategic Air Command tests of Minuteman missile for identification and execution
 Glory Trip – United States Air Force Follow-on Test and Evaluation (FOT&E) program for intercontinental ballistic missiles. Many launches from Vandenberg Launch Facility 2, Vandenberg Air Force Base.
 Golden Spear - regional disaster management cooperation centre in Nairobi, Kenya, created initially with assistance from United States Central Command.
 Gorgon Stare is video capture technology. It is a spherical array of nine cameras attached to an Uninhabited aerial vehicle. The United States Air Force calls it "wide-area surveillance sensor system".
 Exercise Grand Slam was a major naval exercise of the North Atlantic Treaty Organization in the Mediterranean Sea in 1952.
 Granite Sentry was a NORAD Cheyenne Mountain nuclear bunker improvement program during the 1990s.
 Operation Guardian Retrieval - In 1997 United States European Command supervised the U.S. Army's Southern Europe Task Force (SETAF) and elements of two Marine Expeditionary Units to evacuate approximately 550 US citizens from Zaire during the First Congo War.

H 
 Hasty Piper – Recruiting program using volunteers from technical training to return to their home towns to return to their home towns to augment recruiting from July 1972 to February 1972.
 Have Blue – first nickname for Lockheed F-117 Nighthawk special access program development, later Senior Trend.
 Have Doughnut – Defense Intelligence Agency project to evaluate and exploit a Mikoyan-Gurevich MiG-21 "Fishbed-E" (YF-110) that the United States Air Force acquired in 1967 from Israel.
 Have Drill – Defense Intelligence Agency project whose purpose was to evaluate and test a Mikoyan-Gurevich MiG-17 (ASCC "Fresco") (YF-113A) fighter aircraft. 
Have Ferry – Defense Intelligence Agency project whose purpose was to evaluate and exploit a Mikoyan-Gurevich MiG-17 "Fresco-C" (YF-114C) fighter aircraft. 
 Have Leap – A Space and Missile Test Center support of Minuteman-III program
 Have Privilege – Defense Intelligence Agency project whose purpose was to evaluate and exploit a Shenyang J-5 ("YF-113C") fighter aircraft. 
 Heavy Bare – Air Training Command training program to enable a fighter squadrons to deploy to a "bare base' under Coronet Bare.
 High Flight – search and rescue activities during the period 15 September 1997 – 17 October 1997 carried out from Windhoek, Namibia following the mid-air collision of a U.S. Lockheed C-141 Starlifter and a German Tupolev Tu-154 transport aircraft.
 High Bar – Strategic Air Command Operations Order 63-65, covering worldwide SAC drone operations
 High Tide – Modification to Republic F-84 Thunderjets of the 136th Fighter-Bomber Wing to extend their range by equipping them for air refueling during the Korean War.
 Hula Hoop, Nice Dog, Dial Flower, Pock Mark (USNS Wheeling), Pot Luck – code names concerned with the monitoring of French nuclear tests at Mururoa Atoll, French Polynesia, 1972 and 1973.

I 
 Impala Rider - contingency planning to retain U.S. troops in Iraq after 2010.
 Infinite Moonlight – U.S.–Jordanian exercise, 1990s.
 Operation Infinite Reach - cruise missile strikes on al-Qaeda bases in Khost, Afghanistan, and the Al-Shifa pharmaceutical factory in Khartoum, Sudan, on August 20, 1998. Missiles launched by United States Navy
 Exercise Internal Look – one of U.S. Central Command's primary planning events from the 1980s onwards. It had frequently been used to train CENTCOM to be ready to defend the Zagros Mountains from a Soviet attack and was held annually.
 Operation Instant Thunder was the name given to air strike planning options by the United States Air Force in late 1990 during Operation Desert Shield. Designed by Colonel John A. Warden III, it was planned to be an overwhelming strike which would devastate the Iraq Armed Forces with minimum loss of civilian as well as American life. Name was chosen in reference to Rolling Thunder and the perceived failure of step by step escalation of air strikes on North Vietnam in the 1960s and 1970s. Instead the intention was a large, heavy blow instantly ("shock and awe").
 Iris Gold – On 3 October 1994, Company C, Second Battalion, 5th Special Forces Group (Airborne) was deployed on Iris Gold 95-1 for presences forward and pre-mission training with selected elements of the Kuwait Ministry of Defense (MOD). The training mission rapidly transitioned to defense of Kuwait operation establishing a Combat Air Support (CAS) umbrella, which became part of Operation Vigilant Warrior.
 Iron Clad - second designation for specially equipped Lockheed P-3 Orion long range maritime patrol aircraft, operated by VPU-1 and VPU-2 (Patrol Squadron, Special Projects), U.S. Navy.
 Operation Iron Hand – Suppression of Enemy Air Defenses missions in Southeast Asia, 1965–1973
 Island Thunder – U.S.-Italian "non-combatant evacuation exercise", 1996, 1997. Island Thunder 12 was a DOE NNSA-FBI sponsored weapons of mass destruction domestic crisis management table top exercise, part of the Silent Thunder series, held in Hawaii, 29 March 2012.
The raid was intended to free U.S. prisoners of war, but failed because the POWs had already been moved.
 Operation Ivy Bells was a joint United States Navy, Central Intelligence Agency, and National Security Agency mission whose objective was to place wire taps on Soviet underwater communication lines from 1971.

J 
 Exercise Jack Frost (later known as BRIM FROST) – exercise by U.S. forces in Alaska.
 Jagged Thorn – British exercise in Sudan, 1978, with 1st Battalion Grenadier Guards and elements Life Guards (Acorn, magazine of Life Guards, 1979).
 Joint Anvil – unknown special operation, 1999-2001
 Operation Joint Endeavor – NATO operation to enforce the Treaty of Paris ending the war in Bosnia-Herzegovina. Began when the Allied Rapid Reaction Corps entered Bosnia on 20 December 1995.
 Operation Joint Forge – NATO support for SFOR 1998-c.2005
 Operation Joint Guard – NATO follow-on force to Joint Endeavor, SFOR, Bosnia-Herzegovina, 1996–1998
 Joint Guardian – NATO-led Kosovo Force
 Joint Spirit – NATO Combined Joint Task Force CPX/computer-aided exercise, planned as a building block for Strong Resolve, 1–30 September 2001. Cut short after the September 11, 2001, terrorist attacks.
 Operation Joint Venture
 Exercise Joint Winter – NATO exercise in Norway, 5–16 March 2001.
 Jolly Roger – UK national submarine exercise, 1995
 Jukebox Lotus – Operations in Libya after the attack on U.S. Consulate in Benghazi.
 Operation Jump Start
 Operation Junction City – 1966 Vietnam War airborne operation in War Zone C, South Vietnam
 Exercise Judicious Response – U.S. Africa Command CJCS-directed warfighting TTX. JR 15 included certification of 2nd Marine Expeditionary Brigade.
 Junction Rain – Maritime security operations in the Gulf of Guinea.
 Junction Serpent – Surveillance operations of ISIS forces near Sirte, Libya
 Juniper – EUCOM/Israeli first word.
 Juniper Cobra
 Juniper Falconry – On 29 March 1992, Vice Admiral W. A. Owens, Commander, United States Sixth Fleet, embarked aboard  with a 28-man Army, Navy, and Air Force staff including Brigadier General James Mathers (Commanding General, Provide Comfort) at Haifa for Exercise Juniper Falconry II. From 1–7 April, Monterey was underway for Juniper Falconry II, with a two-day port visit in Haifa on 3–4 April. From 7–9 April, Monterey visited Haifa again for exercise debriefs and to disembark the Joint Task Force.
 Juniper Fox, Juniper Hawk, 
 Juniper Stallion - see Command History,  for the year 2000, via http://history.navy.mil.
 Juniper Micron – Airlift of French forces to combat Islamic extremists in Mali
 Juniper Nimbus – Support for Nigerian Forces against Boko Haram
 Operation Juniper Shield – Counterterrorism operations in the northwest African Sahara/Sahel. formerly known as Operation Enduring Freedom – Trans Sahara (OEF-TS); name change occurred 2012–13, though OEF-TS was still be used at times in 2014. Closely linked with 'Flintlock' exercise.
 Jupiter Garrett – Joint Special Operations Command operation against high value targets in Somalia. Included Task Force 4-84 in 2011-2012.
 Operation Just Cause – 1989 incursion into Panama to oust Manuel Noriega.
 Operation Justice Reach
 Justified Seamount – Counter piracy operation off east African coast

K 
 Exercise Keen Edge/Keen Sword – U.S./Japan defense of Japan exercise. Every two years, the US and Japan hold the Keen Sword exercise, the biggest military exercise around Japan. Japan and the United States participate, with Canada playing a smaller role.
 Keystone – Overall name for withdrawal of US forces from Vietnam (see Banner)
 Keystone Bluejay (Increment III) Withdrawal of 50,000 troops by 15 April 1970
 Keystone Cardinal (Increment II) Reduction of troop ceiling to 484,000 by 15 December 1969
 Keystone Eagle (Increment I) Reduction of troop ceiling to 534,500 in August 1969
 Keystone Oriole Alpha (Increment VII) Reduction of 100,000 by 1 December 1970
 Keystone Robin Alpha, Bravo, Charlie (Increments IV, V, VI) 3 reductions of 50,000/ 40,000/ 60,000 by 15 April 1971
 Kodiak Hunter – Training of Kenyan forces for operations in Somalia
 Keystone – Prefix for withdrawal of USAF units from Vietnam as part of "Vietnamization"  See also Banner.
 Keystone Bluejay –  Movement of 16th Tactical Reconnaissance Squadron to Misawa Air Base and inactivation of 557th, 558th and 559th Tactical Fighter Squadrons.
 Keystone Cardinal – movement of U-10 and C-47 aircraft of 5th Special Operations Squadron to Korea.
 Keystone Robin Alfa – 31st Tactical Fighter Wing moved to United States, 531st Tactical Fighter Squadron inactivated and planes returned to the United States, A-37s of the 8th and 90th Special Operations Squadrons turned over to the Vietnamese Air Force.
 Keystone Robin Bravo – Return of 45th Tactical Reconnaissance Squadron planes to the United States.

L 
 Left Hook –  Deployment of Long Arm RB-47H and Ryan 147D drones to the Philippines.  The drones were to locate SA-2 surface to air missile sites, which would then be attacked by fighter aircraft. Two drone launches in August 1965 were both shot down by ground fire.  The project was abandoned and resources rolled into United Effort. 
 Lightning Bug – Big Safari program to modify Ryan BQM-34 Firebee target drones to Model 147 Firefly special purpose drones.
 Lone Eagle – Design of longer range reconnaissance drone starting in 1966. Renamed Compass Arrow
 Long Arm – Project to fly Ryan 147 drones near SA-2 surface to air missile sites, transmitting ELINT to nearby Boeing RB-47H aircraft nearby, but out of range of the missiles.  Planned for operation over Cuba in December 1962, but not deployed.  Tested in 1965 with Ryan 147D drones. Deployed as Left Hook.
 Long Skip – Support for India in border dispute with China in Kashmir, 1962–1963
 Long Life – launch of LGM-30 Minuteman from 'live' launch facility with seven seconds of fuel.
 Exercise Long Look - long-established individual exchange program between Commonwealth armies. For example, Captain Katie Hildred, Queen Alexandra's Royal Army Nursing Corps, was dispatched on Exercise Long Look in New Zealand in 2017, a four-month program that was planned to see her deploy on various exercises and training packages with the New Zealand Army.
Operation Looking Glass – SAC/Strategic Command survivable airborne command post. The name came from the aircraft's ability to "mirror" the command and control functions of the underground command post at Strategic Air Command headquarters. Began 1961.
 Operation Louisville Slugger – 1971 RF-4C Phantom II reconnaissance north of the DMZ to locate North Vietnam Fan Song radar sites
 Lucky Dragon – U-2E photographic reconnaissance missions flown from Clark Air Base, then from Bien Hoa Air Base over North Viet Nam, starting 14 February 1964. The missions provided intelligence for Military Assistance Command Vietnam and Pacific Command, and later included SIGINT.  Renamed Trojan Horse in December 1964.

M 
 Operation Mango Ramp, "M" starting letter probably indicating Mogadishu - most known as initial airlift entry to Mogadishu for the African Union Mission in Somalia, 2007. In a larger sense, a Department of State [DoS] contract with the African Union Mission in Somalia worth $208m.
 Exercise Mavi Balina – Turkish anti-submarine exercise
 Middle Gust - A U.S. Air Force test conducted at Crowley, CO involving a simulated nuclear overblast of a Minuteman missile silo
 Millennium Challenge 2002
 Mongoose Hunter – Training of Somali forces (Danab Brigade) for operations against Al Shabab
 Operation Mount Hope III - retrieval of abandoned Libyan Mil Mi-25 attack helicopyer from Wadi Doum in the Aozou Strip, Chad, 1988.
 Operation Mountain Resolve – launched by the United States and coalition allies on 7 November 2003 in the Nuristan province and Kunar province in Afghanistan. It involved an airdrop into the Hindu Kush mountains by the U.S. 10th Mountain Division and resulted in the killing of Hezbi commander Ghulam Sakhee, a few clashes, and the finding of some minor weapon caches.
 Mountain Shield I and II – rehearsal exercises for withdrawing UNPROFOR from the former Yugoslavia, 1990s. Mountain Shield I was held at Grafenwöhr, Germany, from 7–15 July 1995, by United States Army Europe.
Operation Mountain Storm began on or about 12 March 2004, following the completion of Operation Mountain Blizzard. Part of spring fighting against Taliban in Afghanistan (Operation Enduring Freedom).

N 
 Exercise Natural Fire – East Africa
 Neon – U.S./Bahrain first word
 Neon Response
 Neon Spark – U.S./Bahrain naval exercise series, including the UK. Neon Spark 98.
 Neon Spear – Disaster response symphosium with Eastern African countries
 New Normal – Development of rapid response capability in Africa
 New Tape – Airlift support for UN operations and humanitarian airlift in Republic of the Congo (Léopoldville) 1960–1964
 Operation Nickel Grass 1973 – Support of Israel during the 1973 October War.
 Exercise Nifty Nugget, a 1978 transportation plans exercise, exposed great gaps in understanding between military and civilian participants: mobilization and deployment plans fell apart, and as a result, the United States and its NATO allies "lost the war". Estimated "400,000 troop 'casualties,' and thousands of tons of supplies and 200,000 to 500,000 trained combat troops would not have arrived at the identified conflict scene on time." "Two major recommendations came out of Nifty Nugget: a direct line of command between the transportation agencies and the Joint Chiefs of Staff; and the creation of an agency responsible for deployments. This agency was to be established as the Joint Deployment Agency, a forerunner to United States Transportation Command.
 Operation Nifty Package was a United States Delta and Navy SEAL-operated plan conducted in December 1989 designed to capture Panamanian leader Manuel Noriega. It unfolded as part of the wider Operation Just Cause. When Noriega took refuge in the Apostolic Nunciature of the Holy See (diplomatic quarter), deafening music and other psychological warfare tactics were used to convince him to exit and surrender himself.

 Operation Night Harvest – investigation of abandoned military aircraft in Iraq
 Operation Night Reach – Transported Second United Nations Emergency Force (UNEF II) peacekeepers to Middle East at end of Yom Kippur War, 6–24 October 1973.
 Night Train was part of a series of chemical and biological warfare tests overseen by the DOD Deseret Test Center as part of Project 112. The test was conducted near Fort Greely, Alaska from November 1963 to January 1964. The primary purpose of Night Train was to study the penetration of an arctic inversion by a biological aerosol cloud.
 Nimble Shield – Operation against Boko Haram and ISIL West Africa.
 Operation Nimbus Moon – Cleared the Suez Canal
 Operation Nimbus Stream – Cleared the Suez Canal
 Operation Nimbus Spar 1974–1975 – Cleared the Suez Canal
 Joint Task Force Noble Anvil 1999 – Operation Allied Force, air war plannnig and execution against Serbia.
 Operation Noble Eagle – Air defense, mobilization of reserve forces after the September 11 terrorist attacks.
 Exercise Noble Jump (:de:Noble Jump) – is a NATO maneuver that took place in the summer of 2015 in Żagań, Poland. A second edition of the maneuver (Noble Jump II) took place in the summer of 2017 in Bulgaria and Romania. In May and June 2019 the exercise will take place again in Żagań, Poland.
 Operation Noble Response – U.S. delivery of over 900,000 kg of food after unseasonable rains and flooding in the northeastern part of Kenya, January-March 1998. Included formation of Joint Task Force Kenya, participation of 43rd Airlift Wing.
 Noble Resolve – a United States Joint Forces Command (USJFCOM) experimentation campaign plan to enhance homeland defense and improve military support to civil authorities in advance of and following natural and man-made disasters.
 Operation Nomad Shadow is the name of a classified military operation that may have begun in November 2007 to share intelligence information between the U.S. and the Republic of Turkey. Appears to involve UAV patrols, potentially in connection with the Syrian Civil War.
 Operation Nomad Vigil – deployment to Gjadër Air Base, Albania of General Atomics MQ-1 Predator unmanned aerial vehicles, April 1995 – 1996.
 Operation Nordic Shield II was held in the summer of 1992. As they did five years before, units of the 94th Army Reserve Command, principally the 187th Infantry Brigade (Separate), the 167th Support Group (Corps) and their subordinate battalions and companies, deployed to Canadian Forces Base Gagetown in southern New Brunswick, to simulate the defense of Iceland against Warsaw Pact forces. Iceland defense was the CAPSTONE mission of both the 187th IB and 167th Support Group. Part of the 1992 exercise included lanes training as part of the United States Army Forces Command's "Bold Shift" initiative to reinforce unit war-fighting task proficiency.
 Operation Northern Delay occurred on 26 March 2003 as part of the 2003 invasion of Iraq. It involved dropping paratroopers of the 173rd Airborne Brigade into Northern Iraq.  It was the last large-scale combat parachute operation conducted by the U.S. military.
 Exercise Northern Edge – exercise in Alaska
 Exercise Northern Entry – 1 New Zealand Special Air Service Group special forces training in Canada. Solely NZ exercise.
 Exercise Northern Light – 1 NZ SAS Group extreme cold weather training in Norway.
 Exercise Northern Safari – Conducted on Great Barrier Island from 5–28 March (1983 or 1984). The aim was to mobilize the New Zealand Army Ready Reaction Force and practice selected elements in air/sea deployment and the conduct of operations.
 Exercise Northern Strike is an annual readiness exercise hosted by the Michigan National Guard at Camp Grayling and Alpena Combat Readiness Training Center each August. Beginning in 2012, the exercise has grown to become the largest joint reserve component exercise in the United States.
 Operation Northern Watch – 1997–2003 enforcement of No Fly Zone over northern Iraq.
 Northern Wind 2019 – Swedish, Norwegian, Finnish main-defense style exercise being conducted on the Swedish/Finn border March 2019. Live exercise March 20–27. Fifteen hundred Finnish troops incorporated into Swedish 3rd Brigade; Norway to contribute the entirety of Brigade North including elements No. 339 Squadron RNoAF, a United States Marine Corps infantry battalion and a Royal Marines company group. Exercise area stretching from Boden (SWE) to Haparanda in Finland, and north to vicinity of Overtornea.

O 
 Operation Oaken Sonnet
 Oaken Sonnet I – 2013 rescue of United States personnel from South Sudan during its civil war
 Oaken Sonnet II – 2014 operation in South Sudan
 Oaken Sonnet III – 2016 operation in South Sudan
 Oaken Steel – July 2016 to January 2017 deployment to Uganda and reinforcement of security forces at US embassy in South Sudan.
 Objective Voice – Information operations and psychological warfare in Africa
 Oblique Pillar – private contractor helicopter support to U.S. Navy SEAL-advised units of the Somali National Army fighting al-Shabaab in Somalia. The operation was in existence as of February 2018. Bases used included Camp Lemonnier, Djibouti; Mombasa and Wajir, Kenya; Baidoa, Baledogle, Kismayo and Mogadishu, Somalia; Entebbe, Uganda.
 Old Fox - Minuteman III flight tests by the United States Air Force
 Operation Observant Compass – initially attempts to kill Joseph Kony and eradicate the Lord's Liberation Army. In 2017, with around $780 million spent on the operation, and Kony still in the field, the United States wound down Observant Compass and shifted its forces elsewhere. But the operation didn't completely disband, according to the Defense Department: “U.S. military forces supporting Operation Observant Compass transitioned to broader.. security and stability activities that continue the success of our African partners."
 Obsidian Lotus – Training Libyan special operations units
 Obsidian Mosaic – Operation in Mali.
 Obsidian Nomad I – Counterterrorism operation in Diffa, Niger
 Obsidian Nomad II – Counterterrorism operation in Arlit, Niger
 Octave Anchor – Psychological warfare operations focused on Somalia.
 Octave Shield – operation by Combined Joint Task Force – Horn of Africa.
 Octave Soundstage – Psychological warfare operations focused on Somalia.
 Octave Stingray – Psychological warfare operations focused on Somalia.
 Octave Summit – Psychological warfare operations focused on Somalia.
 Operation Odyssey Dawn – air campaign against Libya, 2011.
 Odyssey Lightning – Airstrikes on Sirte, Libya in 2016.
 Odyssey Resolve – Intelligence, Surveillance and Reconnaissance operations in area of Sirte, Libya.
 Oil Burner – Strategic Air Command low level bomber training. Replaced by Olive Branch.
 Old Bar – Telemetry checks of the Ryan 147G flown with EB-47H October to November 1966 from Bien Hoa Air Base, South Vietnam.  Operational missions against SA-2 sites may have also been flown. 
 Olive Branch – Strategic Air Command low level bomber training. Replaced Oil Burner. Name later dropped and training areas called Instrument Routes or Visual Routes.
 Olympic Defender – "U.S. space war plan", to be first shared with unspecified allies after a new version of the plan was promulgated in December 2018.
 Exercise Open Gate - NATO air/naval exercise in the Mediterranean, late 1970s. 1979 iteration included No. 12 Squadron RAF deployment from Honington to RAF Gibraltar, carrying out the low-level anti-shipping mission.
 Olympic Arena III – Strategic Air Command missile competition of all nine operational missile units
 Olympic Event – A Minuteman III nuclear operational systems test
 Olympic Play – A Strategic Air Command missiles and operational ground equipment program for EWO missions
 Olympic Torch – U-2R COMINT system in Southeast Asia, renamed from Senior Book on 11 April 1972.
 Olympic Trials – A program to represent a series of launches having common objectives
 Exercise Orient Shield – United States Army/JGSDF annual exercise

P 
 Pacer Bravo – Project to furnish the Vietnamese Air Force with trainers and training aids for maintenance courses.
 Pacer Classic – 1985 program to upgrade Northrop T-38 trainer airframes and engines.
 Operation Pacer Goose – annual resupply of Thule Air Base, Greenland, by a heavy supply ship each summer.  made the trip in 2010.
 Pacer Galaxy – Support of Minuteman force modification program
 PACEX (Pacific Exercise) United States Pacific Fleet exercise series. PACEX '89 was the biggest peacetime exercise since the end of World War II. It was designed by Seventh Fleet "to determine the ability of US and allied naval forces to sustain high tempo combat operations for an extended period." Three aircraft carrier battle groups, and two different battleship battle groups, gathered off the U.S. West Coast, proceeded through the Gulf of Alaska and the Pacific Ocean to Japan, and merged to conducted Battle Force operations against "opposing" USAF and JASDF and Navy as ANNUALEX 01G.  served as the "..Anti-Air Warfare Coordinator for her successive battle groups and as alternate AAWC for the entire Battle Force. Steaming into the Sea of Japan, Antietam was also the AAWC for the Amphibious Task Force as they made their assault on the South Korean beach as Exercise VALIANT BLITZ 90." Test of Maritime Strategy. See also  Also PACEX 02.
 Pacific Bond – U.S.-Australian army reserve exchange
 Pacific Castle – Pacific naval exercise
 Pacific Haven – emergency evacuation of pro-U.S. Kurds to Andersen Air Force Base, Guam, September 1996-April 1997.
 Pacific Horizon – WMD exercise
 Pacific Kukri – UK–NZ exercise, 2000–2001
 Pacific Look – U.S.–Australian army reserve exchange, 1997
 Pacific Nightingale – Pacific Air Forces exercise, South Korea
 Exercise Pacific Partnership
 Pacific Protector – Proliferation Security Initiative exercise involving Japanese-flagged merchant ship simulating carrying WMD.
 Pacific Reserve
 Pacific Spectrum
 Pacific Warrior – SPAWAR telemedicine exercise connected to South Korea
 Pacific Wind
 Palace Lightning - USAF withdrawal of its aircraft and personnel from Thailand.
 Paladin Hunter – Counterterrorism operation in Puntland, probably referring to U.S. support for Puntland Security Force
 Pave Eagle – Modified Beechcraft Bonanza drone aircraft for low altitude sensor monitoring.
 Pave Hawk – Sikorsky HH-60 Pave Hawk special operations and combat search and rescue helicopter.
 Pave Nail - OV-10 Bronco with Pave Spot target laser designator pod.
 Pave Knife – Ford Aerospace AN/AVQ-10 Pave Knife early laser targeting pod.
 Pave Low – Sikorsky MH-53 Pave Low special ops and combat search and rescue helicopter.
 Pave Mint – Upgrade of the AN/ALQ-117 electronic warfare system to the AN/ALQ-172.
 Pave Mover – Demonstration program to develop the AN/APY-7 radar wide-area surveillance, ground moving target indicator (GMTI), fixed target indicator (FTI) target classification, and synthetic aperture radar (SAR), for the E-8 Joint STARS.
 Pave Onyx – Vietnam era Advanced Location Strike System c.1973.
 Pave Pace – A fully integrated avionics architecture featuring functional resource allocation.
 Pave Paws – The Phased-Array Warning System which replaced the three BMEWS radars. Pave in this case is a backronym for Perimeter or Precision Acquisition Vehicle Entry.
 Pave Penny – Lockheed-Martin AN/AAS-35(V) laser spot tracker.
 Pave Pepper – An Air Force SAMSO (Space & Missile Systems Organization) project to decrease the size of the Minuteman III warheads and allow for more to be launched by one Minuteman.
 Pave Pillar – Generic core avionics architecture system for combat aircraft.
 Pave Pronto – Lockheed AC-130 Spectre gunship program.
 Pave Spectre – Lockheed AC-130E gunships.
 Pave Spike – Westinghouse AN/ASQ-153\AN/AVQ-23 electro-optical laser designator pod.
 Pave Sword – AN/AVQ-11 Pave Sword laser tracker.
 Pave Tack – Ford Aerospace AN/AVQ-26 electro-optical targeting pod. Used first on F-4 and then later on F-111F model aircraft.
 PANAMAX – exercise to defend the Panama Canal. Held 2005 and in 2006, under the leadership of Commander, United States Naval Forces Southern Command.
 Peace Atlas II
 Peace Crown - air defense automation study for Imperial Iranian Air Force (Foreign Military Sales), effective 3 August 1972, LGFX.
 Peace Echo –Training of Israeli Air Force aircrew and maintenance personnel on the McDonnell F-4E Phantom II.
 Peace Fortress - delivery of AN/TPS-43E radars to Sudan, effective date 25 January 1978.
 Peace Hawk - Foreign Military Sales case for Northrop F-5B/E aircraft, effective date 8 September 1971, USAF implementing organization SMS/AC.
 Peace Hercules - Foreign Military Sales of Lockheed C-130H aircraft for the Congo, effective date 11 September 1973, implementing organization SMSAC.
 Peace Icarus - Foreign Military Sales of McDonnell Douglas F-4E aircraft for Greece, effective date 3 April 1972, USAF implementing organization LGFXR.
 Peace Inca - Northrop F-5s for Peru, effective date 8 February 1973, LGFXR.
 Peace Start – Later name for Peace Hawk.
 Phoenix Banner – "Special Air Mission", air transportation of the president of the United States, aircraft usually codenamed Air Force One. The basic procedures for such flights are stipulated in Air Force Instruction #11-289.
 Phoenix Duke I and II - involved NATO efforts to resettle ethnic Albanians into a secure environment as part of the peace agreement with Serbia, 1999, with participation of 433rd Airlift Wing.
 Phoenix Copper – flights flown in support of the Secret Service for VIPs other than the president and vice president.
 Operation Phoenix Jackal – Support for Saudi Arabian and Kuwait against Iraq in 1994
 Phoenix Oak – See Coronet Oak.  Operation name when directed by Air Combat Command 1992–?
 Phoenix Raven program involves specially trained United States Air Force Security Forces airmen flying with and protecting Air Mobility Command aircraft around the world, in areas where there is "inadequate security."
 Operations Phoenix Scorpion I & II 1997–1998, also phases III and IV. Deployment of additional troops and equipment to Kuwait, Saudi Arabia, and the Middle East during 'Desert Thunder' confrontation with Iraq. In 1998 the 433rd Airlift Wing participated in Phoenix Scorpions I – III. Phoenix Scorpion IV involved David Grant USAF Medical Center.
 Phoenix Silver designates a Special Air Mission flight involving the Vice President of the United States.
 Exercise Pitch Black – air exercise held in northern Australia
 Polo Hat – nuclear command and control exercise
 Polo Step (code name)- classified as Top Secret, Polo Step was a United States Department of Defense code name or ‘compartment’ that was initially created in the late 1990s to designate closely held planning information on covert operations against Al Qaeda in Afghanistan. A person could have a Top Secret clearance, but if they would not have a need to know about the planning as well, they did not have a ‘Polo Step’ authorization. Following the September 11, 2001 attacks, ‘Polo Step’ started to be used by United States Central Command to be the planning compartment for the 2003 invasion of Iraq.
 Operation Pocket Money – Mining of Haiphong harbor starting in May 1972.
 Operation Pony Express – was the covert transportation of, and the provision of aerial support for, indigenous soldiers and material operating across the Laotian and North Vietnamese borders during the Vietnam War.
 Exercise Port Call 86 was a Joint Chiefs of Staff sponsored command post exercise carried out 12–22 November 1985 (CENTCOM Command History 1985 via https://www3.centcom.mil/FOIALibrary/Search, p. 100).
 Operation Power Flite – a United States Air Force mission in which three Boeing B-52 Stratofortresses became the first jet aircraft to circle the world nonstop, when they made the journey in January 1957 in 45 hours and 19 minutes, using in-flight refueling to stay aloft. The mission was intended to demonstrate that the United States had the ability to drop a hydrogen bomb anywhere in the world.
 Operation Power Pack – Intervention in the Dominican Republic following 1965 military coup.
 Proud Phantom - unprogrammed tactical deployment ordered by Secretary of Defense/JCS, not part of the regular exercise program, in which 12 F-4E Phantom IIs and at least 400 personnel were dispatched to Cairo West Air Base, Egypt, during FY 80.
 Operation Prime Chance – special operations forces operating off U.S. Navy vessels in the Persian Gulf, mid-1980s.
 Operation Prize Bull – September 1971 trikes against North Vietnamese POL storage sites 
 Promise Kept – International Committee of the Red Cross facilitated visit to the crash site of Scott Speicher, Iraq, 1995.
 Operation Proud Bunch – Plan to strike hard logistics sites in North Vietnam within 35 miles of the DMZ.  Combined with Operation Fracture Deep as Operation Proud Deep.
 Operation Proud Deep – Combined Operation Fracture Deep and Operation Proud Bunch to strike Vietnam People's Air Force bases and logistics sites south of 18th parallel.
 Operation Proud Deep Alpha – Extension of Operation Proud Deep to targets south of 20th parallel.
 Proven Force – northern air campaign from Turkey over Iraq in 1991. General Jamerson activated JTF Proven Force at Ramstein Air Base, Germany. The task force had three component organizations: Commander Air Force Forces (later to be mostly the 7440th Composite Wing (Prov)), Commander Army Forces, and Commander Joint Special Operations Task Force, which would seek and rescue downed allied pilots.
 Provide – EUCOM humanitarian assistance operations first word
 Provide Assistance
 Operation Provide Comfort – Provide Comfort II – Kurdish security zone in northern Iraq, 1991.
 Provide Hope I/II/III/IV/V Airlift of humanitarian relief to Commonwealth of Independent States
 Provide Promise Airlift of humanitarian relief to Bosnia Herzegovina
 Provide Refuge
 Operation Provide Relief – 1992 humanitarian relief missions to Somalia. See Operation Restore Hope.
 Provide Transition
 Purple – British joint exercise prefix
 Purple Dragon – joint forced entry operations. Purple Dragon 00/Roving Sands 00, Fort Bragg and Puerto Rico; Purple Dragon 98/JTFEX 98–1, Fort Bragg and Puerto Rico, Jan-Feb. 1998.
 Exercise Purple Star/Royal Dragon – held in April–May 1996, the exercise brought together the XVIII Airborne Corps and the 82nd Airborne Division (both from the United States), 5th Airborne Brigade (British Army), the U.S. Air Force, the Royal Air Force, the U.S. Marines, 3 Commando Brigade Royal Marines and the Royal Navy. It saw the deployment of 5th Airborne Brigade to North Carolina in the largest Anglo-American exercise for twenty-three years. U.S. Atlantic Command, headquartered at Norfolk, Virginia, directed the exercise. The aim of the operation was to practise a joint UK force in combined manoeuver in an overseas theatre. The exercise provided the first opportunity to test the new UK Permanent Joint Headquarters, which provided the core of the British Joint Headquarters in support of the exercise Joint Commander. The exercise also was designed to test the new UK Joint Rapid Deployment Force which was established on 1 August 1996. A description of 1st Brigade, 82nd Airborne Division's experience during Royal Dragon can be found in Tom Clancy, Airborne: A Guided Tour of an Airborne Task Force, Berkley Books, New York, 1997, 222–228.
 Purple Guardian – U.S. homeland defense exercise
 Purple Horizon – Cyprus, 2005.
 Purple Solace – 4-6 Jun 2013 Three officers from the Combined Joint Operations from the Sea Center of Excellence (CJOS COE) supported the U.S. Joint Forces Staff College's Exercise “Purple Solace” as mentors. This exercise is a 3-day faculty guided planning exercise which reinforces the initial steps necessary to derive a mission statement and a commander's intent (end state) and a limited Concept of Operations in response to a series of natural disasters.
 Exercise Purple Sound – A high level computer assisted exercise designed to support the training of the Command and Staff of the Permanent Joint Headquarters which deploys and commands the Joint Rapid Deployment Force.
 Operation Purple Storm
 Exercise Purple Warrior

Q 
 Operation Quick Lift 1995 – Support of NATO Rapid Reaction Force and Croatia forces deployment to Bosnia-Herzegovina.

R 
 Rainmaker – Turse and Naylor write that this United States Africa Command codename refers to "A highly sensitive classified signals intelligence effort. Bases used: Chebelley, Djibouti; Baidoa, Baledogle, Kismayo and Mogadishu, Somalia."
 Rapid Trident 14 – the exercise, in Lviv, Ukraine, near the border with Poland, is to “promote regional stability and security, strengthen partnership capacity, and foster trust while improving interoperability between USAREUR, the land forces of Ukraine, and other (NATO and partner) nations,” according to the USAREUR website.
 Operation Ready Swap – Use of reserve units to transport aircraft engines between Air Materiel Command's depots.
 Exercise Real Thaw – an annual exercise run by the Portuguese Air Force with the participation of the Army and Navy and foreign military forces. The exercise has the objective of creating a realistic as possible operational environment in which Portuguese forces might participate, provide joint training with both land, air and naval forces, and provide interoperability between different countries.
 Operation Red Hat – publicly acknowledged part of this operation involved relocation of chemical and biological weapons stored in Okinawa to Johnston Atoll for destruction. Most of the operation took place at night, to avoid observation of the operation by the Okinawans, who resented the presence of chemical munitions on the island. The Chemical weapons were brought from Okinawa under Operation Red Hat with the re-deployment of the 267th Chemical Company and consisted of rockets, mines, artillery projectiles, and bulk 1-ton containers filled with Sarin, Agent VX, vomiting agent, and blister agent such as mustard gas. Chemical agents were stored in the high security Red Hat Storage Area (RHSA) which included hardened igloos in the weapon storage area, the Red Hat building (#850), two Red Hat hazardous waste warehouses (#851 and #852), an open storage area, and security entrances and guard towers. There are indications that the codename was also used to designate storage and/or testing of chemical and biological agents on Okinawa in the 1960s, connected with Project 112.
 Reef Point - first designation for specially equipped Lockheed P-3 Orion long range maritime patrol aircraft, operated by VPU-1 and VPU-2 (Patrol Squadron, Special Projects), U.S. Navy.
 Exercise Reforger – Return of Forces to Germany (Cold War).
 Joint Task Force Resolute Response (1998) - United States Central Command response to U.S. embassy bombings in Kenya.
 Operation Resolute Support – NATO non-combat advisory and training mission to support the Government of the Islamic Republic of Afghanistan from 2015 onwards.
 Operation Restore Hope – U.S. participation in UNOSOM II, 1992–1994, Somalian humanitarian aid and security efforts.
 Resultant Fury – DoD activity in November 2004 which included the weapons testing of free-fall bombs against decommissioned USN vessels off Hawaii.
 Exercise RIMPAC – Rim of the Pacific Exercise, large-scale U.S. Pacific Fleet activity with allied involvement.
 Rivet Add – Modification of Minuteman-II launch facilities to hold Minuteman III missiles
 Rivet Amber – one of a kind Boeing RC-135E reconnaissance aircraft equipped with a large 7 MW Hughes Aircraft phased-array radar system. Originally designated C-135B-II, project name Lisa Ann.
 Rivet Cap – 1981-1984 decommissioning of Titan II intercontinental ballistic missiles
 Rivet Mile – Minuteman Integrated Life Extension. Included IMPSS security system upgrade.
 Rivet Rider – Volant Solo EC-130Es Psychological warfare aircraft with full suite of electronic combat equipment.
 Rivet Save – A Minuteman crew sleep program modification to reduce personnel number
 Rivet Switch – A 1970s program to upgrade VHF and UHF air/ground communications to solid state devices.
 Operation Rolling Thunder Air strikes on North Vietnam.
 Rugged Nautilus '96 – a joint service exercise aimed at discouraging any possible terrorist challenges through a show of force in the Gulf while the 1996 Atlanta Olympics were underway. Also described as "..a USAF-Navy exercise to test US Central Command's ability to gather and organize forces quickly in theater."

S 
 Exercise Saber Guardian – July 2016 exercise involving 116th Cavalry Brigade Combat Team (ARNG) and troop elements from Armenia, Azerbaijan, Bulgaria, Canada, Georgia, Moldova, Poland, Romania, Ukraine and the U.S.
 Saber Safe – Minuteman pre-launch survivability program
 Saber Secure – A Minuteman rebasing program
 Safari Hunter - 2017 operation in Somalia with SNA/Jubaland striking north from Kismayo against Al-Shabaab centered in Middle Juba. "Hunter" series shows Somali National Army Danab participation.

 Exercise Safe Skies – 2011 Ukrainian, Polish and American air forces fly-together to help prepare the Polish and Ukrainians for enhanced air supremacy and air sovereignty operations. Envisaged as helping lead up to Ukraine hosting Euro 2012. California Air National Guard began preparing the event in 2009 via the State Partnership Program.
 Exercise Sage Brush – November–December 1955 joint U.S. Army/Air Force exercise at Fort Polk, Louisiana, lasting forty-five days. Involved 110,000 Army and 30,500 Air Force personnel to trial army airmobility concepts to try to settle a dispute over the matter by the Army and Air Force. Some helicopter lift provided by the special 516th Troop Carrier Group, Assault, Rotary Wing, flying Piasecki H-21s as part of the 20th Combat Airlift Division (Provisional).

 Saharan Express – AFRICOM Naval Forces Africa scheduled and conducted, multilateral combined maritime exercises with West and North African nations, supported by European partners, focusing on maritime security, and domain awareness. Saharan Express 2012 was to be held 23–30 April 2012.
 Exercise Salty Hammer – NATO air defense exercise, including sorties flown over the UK.
 Operation Secure Tomorrow was a multinational peace operation that took place from February 2004 to July 2004 in Haiti.
 Seed Hawk X-Ray – 1971 program to modify Wild Weasel aircraft to operate the AGM-78B Standard ARM
 Senior Ball – Shipment of material directed by USAF.
 Senior Blade – Senior Year ground station (a van capable of exploiting U-2R digital imagery).
 Senior Blue – Air-to-Air Anti-Radiation Missile (?)
 Senior Book – U-2R COMINT system, used on flights from Korat Royal Thai Air Force Base over the Gulf of Tonkin. First flight 17 August 1971.  Information was downloaded in real time to a ground station at Nakhon Phanom Royal Thai Navy Base for relay to USAF fighters operating in Southeast Asia.  Renamed Olympic Torch 11 April 1972.
 Senior Bowl – 2 B-52Hs, serials 60-21 and 60–36, modified to carry two Lockheed D-21B "Tagboard" reconnaissance drones
 Senior Cejay – Northrop B-2A stealth bomber, former Senior Ice (name changed when the development contract was awarded to Northrop on 4 November 1981). Sometimes quoted as Senior CJ.
 Senior Chevron – Senior Year-related program.
 Senior Citizen – Classified program; probably a projected Special Operations stealth and/or STOL transport aircraft. Arkin writes that this was an Aurora reconnaissance aircraft or similar low observable system (Arkin, 495).
 Senior Class – Shipment of material directed by Headquarters USAF.
 Senior Club – Low-observable anti-tamper advanced technology systems assessment.
 Senior Crown – Lockheed SR-71 reconnaissance aircraft, based on CIA-sponsored A-12 "Oxcart"
 Senior Dagger – A test & evaluation exercise performed by Control Data Corp. for Air Force Rome Air Development Center for purposes of reconnaissance. It may involve flights of Lockheed SR-71 reconnaissance aircraft in Southeast Asia.
 Senior Dance – ELINT/SIGINT program, possibly U-2 related.
 Senior Game – A military item shipping designation.
 Senior Glass – U-2 SIGINT sensor package upgrade combing Senior Spear and Senior Ruby
 Senior Guardian – Grob/E-Systems D-500 Egrett, high-altitude surveillance / reconnaissance aircraft, German-US cooperation, 1980s
 Senior Ice – Advanced Technology Bomber program, including Lockheed proposal and the Northrop B-2 stealth bomber; renamed Senior Cejay on 4 November 1981
 Senior Trend – Lockheed F-117 Nighthawk special access program development, previously Have Blue (Arkin, 496).
 Sentinel Alloy – Land gravity surveys in support of the Minuteman system, cancelled
 Sentinel Aspen – Upgrades in intelligence training, particularly the General Imagery Intelligence Training System.
 Sentinel Lock – Development of raster annotated photography by Aeronautical Charting and Information Service for mapping in Sooutheast Asia.

 Sentry Aloha - Air National Guard fighter exercise, Hawaii, 2006
 Shadow Express – a Non-combatant evacuation operation in Liberia, September–October 1998, to assure the evacuation of Liberian faction leader Roosevelt Johnson (Krahn). USS Firebolt also arrived. (Arkin, 500).
 Operation Sharp Edge – was a non-combatant evacuation operation (NEO) carried out by the 22nd and 26th Marine Expeditionary Units of the United States Marine Corps in Liberia from 5–21 August 1990 (and 1991?). Involved . (Arkin, 503)
 Operation Sharp Guard was a multi-year joint naval blockade in the Adriatic Sea by NATO and the Western European Union on shipments to the former Yugoslavia. Succeeding NATO's Maritime Guard and the WEU's Sharp Fence, it ran from 1993 to 1996.
 Shining Express – NEO evacuation in Liberia, 2003, coordinated aboard .
 Silent Thunder - see Island Thunder
 Silent Warrior – Exercise Silent Warrior 16, held in Garmisch, Germany from Nov. 9-13, 2016, brought together U.S. Special Operations Forces and representatives from 19 African states to discuss cooperative methods to combat violent extremist organizations.
 Operation Sixteen Ton – Use of reserve troop carrier units to move United States Coast Guard equipment From Floyd Bennett Naval Air Station to Isla Grande Airport in Puerto Rico and San Salvador in the Bahamas.
 Sky Shield was a series of three large-scale military exercises conducted in the United States in 1960, 1961, and 1962 by the North American Aerospace Defense Command (NORAD) and the Strategic Air Command (SAC) to test defenses against a Soviet Air Forces attack.
 Operation Southern Watch – Enforcement of no fly zone in southern Iraq
 Exercise Space Flag is a United States Space Force exercise dedicated to providing tactical space units with advanced training under contested, degraded, and operationally-limited ("CDO") conditions. First held circa 2017.
 Exercise Spring Train - an annual Royal Navy-led exercise.
 Operation Steel Box/Golden Python – DOD supported withdrawal of chemical munitions from Germany and coordination of delivery/transport to Johnston Atoll.
 Operation Steep Hill (I through XV) – Planning and intelligence operations for the use of military force to prevent violence in association with civil rights demonstrations in the early 1960s.  Steep Hill XIII called elements of the Alabama National Guard and regular army into service to protect marches from Selma to Montgomery, Alabama.
 Stellar Wind was the code name of a National Security Agency (NSA) warrantless surveillance program begun under the George W. Bush administration's President's Surveillance Program (PSP). The program was approved by President Bush shortly after the September 11, 2001 attacks.
 Sunset Lily - A project to conduct a test launch of a Martin CGM-13B Mace missile from Kadena Air Base, Okinawa to a target island in Japan after testing of the Mace/Matador family had at Cape Canaveral Air Force Station ended.  Cancelled because of political implications.
 Operation Swift Lift – Use of reserve units to transport high priority cargo for the air force during their inactive duty training periods.

T 
 Exercise Talisman Saber
 Tamale Pete – Vietnam War air refueling operations planning. See Young Tiger.
 Tandem Thrust – in 2005, Exercise Tandem Thrust, along with Exercises Crocodile and Kingfisher, was combined to form Exercise Talisman Saber.
 Teal Ruby – STS-62-A was a planned Space Shuttle mission to deliver a reconnaissance payload (Teal Ruby) into polar orbit
 Exercise Teamwork was a major NATO biennial exercise in defense of Norway against a Soviet land and maritime threat. It was established by Norway, Denmark, the UK and the U.S. in 1982 and grew considerably up until the early 1990s. Teamwork '88 allowed NATO to evaluate its ability to conduct a maritime campaign in the Norwegian Sea and project forces ashore in northern Norway. Teamwork '92 was the largest NATO exercise for more than a decade. Held in the northern spring of 1992, it included a total of over 200 ships and 300 aircraft, held in the North Atlantic.
 Tempest Express – United States Pacific Command computer-assisted exercise to train the HQ USPACOM staff to function as a Joint Task Force headquarters. The exercise is held as often as needed, three to seven times a year. Tempest Express 2013 involved elements of the PACOM command post traveling to New Zealand to carry out a disaster relief exercise.
 Tempest Rapid – Employment of DOD resources in natural disaster emergencies in the Continental United States.
 Trojan Horse – Replacement name for Lucky Dragon operations starting in December 1964.  After Operation Rolling Thunder began in March 1965, U-2 flights were restricted from surface to air missile sites. The name changed to Giant Dragon on 1 July 1967.

U 
 Ulchi-Freedom Guardian – previously Ulchi Focus Lens. Command post/computerised exercise simulating the defense of South Korea.
 Ultimate Hunter – "A 127e counterterrorism program using a U.S.-trained, equipped and directed Ugandan force in Somalia." The base mentioned was Camp Lemonnier, Djibouti.
 Union Flash – Simulation exercise, annual, 1998: USAFE Warrior Preparation Center, Einsiedlerhof AFS, Germany, 05/1998.
 United Effort – Use of Ryan 147E drones and Boeing RB-47H to gather ELINT on SA-2 sites in North Viet Nam.  First missions flown 16 October 1965.  Fourth mission successfully captured the fusing signal before being hit by the SA-2.  With the critical information obtained and all drones lost, the operation was terminated in February 1966 and the B-47s returned to Forbes Air Force Base.
 Operation United Shield 1995 – Support of US withdrawal from Somalia.
 Operation Unified Resolve
 Upgrade Silo – A modification improvement program for Minuteman III.
 Upgun Cobras – A Bell Huey Cobra with a Sperry helmet-mounted optical gunsight.
 Operation Uphold Democracy—removal of junta in Haiti
 Upper Hand – A joint U.S.-Norwegian exercise designed to promote proficiency in Anti-Submarine Warfare (ASW), underway logistic support, and communications procedures.
 Operation Urgent Fury — United States invasion of Grenada, 25-29 October 1983.

V 
 Valiant Blitz - 1990 iteration amphibious exercise landing in South Korea, part of larger PACEX 89.
 Exercise Valiant Shield – United States Pacific Command large-scale warfighting exercise
 Exercise Valiant Usher 86 – a declassified U.S. Central Command historical document said that: 'Valiant Usher 86 was conducted in Somalia from 1 to 7 November 1985. Initially planned to be an amphibious, combined/joint exercise including the Mediterranean ARG/MAU and [Somali] forces, the exercise was completely restructured when the ARG was retained in the Mediterranean and replaced with a battalion (-) of the 101st Airborne Division. In spite of limited planning time, the exercise was described as a "total success", highlighting both the rapid capability.. to substitute forces, as well as the flexibility of the forces to accomplish assigned objectives.'
 Victory Scrimmage - V Corps multi-divisional exercise of January–February 2003 to prepare for Operation Iraqi Freedom
 Exercise Vigilant Eagle – NORAD/Russian Armed Forces exercise, repeated several times, involving response to a simulated hijacked airliner over Canadian/U.S./Russian airspace.
 Operation Vigilant Warrior 1994 – Response to Iraqi buildup along Kuwait border.
 Volant Oak – See Coronet Oak.  Operation name when directed by Military Airlift Command from 1977 to 1992
 Volant Solo – Coronet Solo renamed when EC-130Es replaced EC-121s as psychological warfare aircraft.
 Exercise Vortex Warrior – RAF Chinook exercise for desert operations in preparation for Afghan deployments at the U.S. Naval Air Facility El Centro, in Imperial County, Southern California. 2014, planned 2018.

W 
 Wanda Belle – "was Nancy Rae, 1 RC-135S '59-1491', named after Wanda Leigh O'Rear, daughter of Big Safari program director F. E. O'Rear, 01/1964-01/1967, to Rivet Ball, modified under Big Safari."
 White Alice - White Alice Communications System (WACS), a United States Air Force telecommunication network with 80 radio stations located in Alaska during the Cold War.
 White Cloud – (1) A Navy program for liquid propellant guns; (2) USN, ocean reconnaissance/surveillance Naval Ocean Surveillance System, first generation of satellites.

 Operation White Star, also known as Project White Star, was a United States military advisory mission to Laos in 1959–62.
 Wild Weasel – general codename for U.S. Air Force Suppression of Enemy Air Defenses fighter-bomber aircraft. Air-launched anti-radar missile firing aircraft guided by radar emissions.

Y 
 Yankee Team – reconnaissance over Laos 1964; Vietnam War Tanker Task Force.
 Yellow Tag – An electronics project administered by Naval Sea Systems Command.
 Young Tiger – Tanker Task Force. [P]lanned under Tamale Pete, Operations Order for Boeing KC-135 Stratotanker force operating from Kadena Air Base and later Ching Chuan Kang Air Base (1967 onwards), refueling tactical air operations over Vietnam, Laos, etc. after 1965."

See also 
 Lists of allied military operations of the Vietnam War

Notes

References 
 
 
 
 
 
 
 
 
 
 
  (link to Google Books partial text)
 * 
 Parsch, Andreas Code Names for U.S. Military Projects and Operations

External links 
 Electrospaces.net, National Security Agency nicknames and codewords, last updated December 22, 2018.
 https://www.thedrive.com/the-war-zone/29353/how-the-pentagon-comes-up-with-all-those-secret-project-nicknames-and-crazy-code-words (and CJCSM referred to within it).

Department of Defense code names
code names
code names